The roundnose minnow (Dionda episcopa) is a species of ray-finned fish in the family Cyprinidae.
It is found in the Colorado, San Antonio, upper Nueces and Rio Grande drainages in Texas and New Mexico in the United States, and Mexico.

References

Dionda
Freshwater fish of the United States
Freshwater fish of Mexico
Fish described in 1856
Taxa named by Charles Frédéric Girard